Ain Kalaieh (also Romanized as Ā'īn Kalāīeh) is a village in Bala Taleqan Rural District, in the Central District of Taleqan County, Alborz Province, Iran. At the 2006 census, its population was 5, in 4 families.

References 

Populated places in Taleqan County